The Secret of Sagal (Polish: Tajemnica Sagali, German: Das Geheimnis des Sagala) is a Polish-German television series. The story revolves around two boys, Kuba and Jacek, who find a magic stone. They go on a journey through time to obtain other pieces (collectively the Sagal), using its power to bring back their mother.

See also
 List of Polish television series
 List of German television series

External links
 

Polish children's television series
German children's television series
1990s Polish television series
1997 Polish television series debuts
1997 Polish television series endings
1997 German television series debuts
1997 German television series endings
Telewizja Polska original programming
S